The 2016 Judo Grand Prix Samsun was held at the Tekkeköy Yaşar Doğu Arena in Samsun, Turkey from 1 to 3 April 2016.

Medal summary

Men's events

Women's events

Source Results

Medal table

References

External links
 

2016 IJF World Tour
2016 Judo Grand Prix
2016
Grand Prix 2016
Judo